Cal Madow (also Calmadow, Al Madow, Al Medu, or Al Mado;) is a mountain range in Somaliland. It stretches across an area between the east of Erigavo, Somaliland, to the Bari region of Somalia. Its peak sits at almost  in Shimbiris, northwest of Erigavo. Cal Madow was a tourist destination in the late 1980s. The local population of the Sanaag region is primarily responsible for preserving the habitat, which continues to face the risk of deforestation.

Ecology

In addition to rainfall, Cal Madow receives additional precipitation in the form of fog and winter rains, which sustain isolated forests of Juniperus procera, Buxus hildebrandtii, and others. Mist also appears to be important in the distribution of juniperus (dayib), one of the species locals use for timber. For timber production, the buxus (dhoqos), buxus and celtis (boodaar) poles are cut from living trees in the evergreen forest. The discovery of the locust bean (Ceratonia oreothauma), lavenders and many other plant species has emphasized the many links the Cal Madow highlands have with the Mediterranean region. The Lamadaya waterfalls has one of the best-known sceneries in Cal Madow.

Despite the current changes in land use, Cal Madow has internationally valuable unexploited mineral deposits and unique natural habitats. It is considered a key area for oil exploration, and has a petroleum system identical to, and formerly contiguous with, those within the Republic of Yemen. Florally, Cal Madow has approximately 1,000 plant species, 200 of which are only found on this mountain range. The flora of Somalila, much of which constitutes unique genetic resources, contains more than 3000 species of vascular plants, and is thus much richer than that of the Sahel region in general. Of the 156 plant families observed in Somalia, about 21% are restricted to the northern part of the country, while 11% are found in the south. Somalila houses a greater number of endemic plant species, many of which grow in the northern and eastern regions, notably in Cal Madow. Most of these species are herbs not found anywhere else in the world.

Cal Madow and adjacent areas also have richer fauna than many other parts of Horn of Africa, and harbor some of the rarest and most localized of Somali endemic animal species. Here, Warsangli linnet (Carduelis johannis), pigeons (acanthus olivae) and golden-winged grosbeaks can be observed, as can antelopes such as the beira (dorcatragus megalotis), and different subspecies of gazelles.

Botanical survey

In January 1995, a team of botanists led by Dr. Mats Thulin of Uppsala University in Sweden visited the Cal Madow range on behalf of the Flora Somalia Project based in Uppsala. The study they conducted under the guidance of Somali Prof. Ahmed Warfa (Department of Botany and Range, Somali National University) constituted the most extensive botanical survey ever done in the area, with about eight new species of plant discovered in the process.

Furthermore, the area houses an important germplasm, which requires protection from overexploitation and destruction by humans. On the basis of the recent botanical survey in Cal Madow, the team recommended that the local forest should be conserved as a national monument, as it plays an important role in the mountain range's ecosystem and represents a valuable natural resource.

In addition, the forests offer unique opportunities for education and research. The agricultural benefit of clearing the forests, on the other hand, are negligible. The development of a wildlife reserve in these areas is under way and implemented by ECOTERRA Intl. together with the Calmadow Trust. International support should encourage the development of a study center, which would increase awareness of the value of the forest and provide long-term employment benefits. Some of the degraded forest areas could thereby be brought to a more natural state, while other areas would be developed for timber, fuelwood and honey production. Improvements in the efficiency of the present farming, education and medical facilities are also crucial to the success of the proposed wildlife reserve.

See also
 Golis Mountains
 Cal Miskaad

References

Sources
 
 Calmadow Trust
 ECOTERRA Intl.
 

Mountain ranges of Somaliland
Sanaag
Somali montane xeric woodlands